Erica is a genus of roughly 857 species of flowering plants in the family Ericaceae. The English common names heath and heather are shared by some closely related genera of similar appearance. The genus Calluna was formerly included in Erica – it differs in having even smaller scale-leaves (less than 2–3 mm long), and the flower corolla consisting of separate petals. Erica is sometimes referred to as "winter (or spring) heather" to distinguish it from Calluna "summer (or autumn) heather".

Etymology
The Latin word erica means "heath" or "broom". It is believed that Pliny adapted erica from Ancient Greek ἐρείκη. The expected Anglo-Latin pronunciation, may be given in dictionaries (OED: "Erica"), but  is more commonly heard.

Description
Flowers are sometimes axillary, and sometimes borne in terminal umbels or spikes, and are usually outward or downward facing. The seeds are very small, and in some species may survive in the soil for decades.

Taxonomy and phylogeny
Dulfer published the last revision of the genus Erica in the 1960s, treating 605 species. Many new species have subsequently been described (particularly in South Africa) and a further 83 have been included in Erica from former “minor genera”, such as Phillipia Klotzsch and Blaeria L. A more recent overview of Erica species is provided in an electronic identification aid, but a modern taxonomic revision of the genus as a whole is still lacking.

A number of increasingly detailed phylogenetic hypotheses for Erica have been published based on nuclear ribosomal and plastid DNA sequences. The closest relatives of Erica are Daboecia (one or two species) and Calluna (monospecific), representing the oldest surviving lineages of a, by inference, ancestrally Palearctic tribe Ericeae. The small number of European Erica species represent the oldest lineages of the genus, within which a single, order-of-magnitude more species-rich, African clade is nested. Within the African clade, Cape and Madagascan/Mascarene species respectively represent monophyletic groups.

Species

Selected species include:

Habitat
Around 690 of the species are endemic to South Africa, and these are often called the Cape heaths, forming the largest genus in the fynbos. The remaining species are native to other parts of Africa, Madagascar, the Mediterranean, and Europe.

Like most Ericaceae, Erica species are mainly calcifuges, being limited to acidic or very acidic soils.  In fact, the term "ericaceous" is frequently applied to all calcifuges, and to the compost used in their cultivation. Soils range from dry, sandy soils to extremely wet ones such as bog. They often dominate dwarf-shrub habitats (heathland and moorland), or the ground vegetation of open acidic woodland.

Ecology
Plants of this genus are eaten mainly by the larvae of many Lepidoptera species, including emperor moth, garden tiger moth, true lover's knot, wormwood pug, the silver-studded blue, and the Coleophora case-bearers C. juncicolella and C. pyrrhulipennella.

Some species of sunbirds are known to visit and pollinate Erica. Two such species are the southern double-collared sunbird and the orange-breasted sunbird.

Cultivation

Erica species are grown as landscape or garden plants for their floral effect. They associate well with conifers and are frequently seen in planting schemes as massed groundcover beneath varieties of dwarf conifers. They are capable of producing flower colour throughout the year. They can also be grown in tubs or window boxes to provide interest through autumn and into winter.

References

 
Ericaceae genera
Groundcovers
Taxa named by Carl Linnaeus
Subshrubs